Sylvester Zobieski Earle Sr. (1791 – December 4, 1879) was a physician and political figure in New Brunswick. He represented King's County in the Legislative Assembly of New Brunswick from 1843 to 1850 and from 1856 to 1857.

He was born in Queens County, New Brunswick and studied medicine in New York. Earle married Maria Hughson and returned to Kings County, New Brunswick. He died at Hampton.

His son Sylvester Zobieski Earle was mayor of Saint John.

References 
The Canadian biographical dictionary and portrait gallery of eminent and self-made men ... (1881) - biography for his son

1791 births
1879 deaths
Members of the Legislative Assembly of New Brunswick
Colony of New Brunswick people